This is a list of the preserved important buildings in Quito, capital of Ecuador.

Quito is a UNESCO World Heritage Site since 1978.

Colonial

Post-Colonial

References

 
Quito
List

Quito
Quito